Virtually all Mauritanians are Sunni Muslims. They adhere to the Maliki madhhab, one of the four Sunni schools of law. Since independence in 1960, Mauritania has been an Islamic republic. The Constitutional Charter of 1985 declares Islam the state religion and sharia the law of the land.

History

The Umayyads were the first Arab Muslims to enter Mauritania. During the Islamic conquests, they made incursions into Mauritania and were present in the region by the end of the 7th century. Many Berber tribes in Mauritania fled the arrival of the Arabs to the Gao region in Mali.

It was not until the nineteenth century that the brotherhoods  (Sufism and tariqa) assumed importance when they attempted to make religion a force for expanding identities and loyalties beyond the limits of kinship. The relative peace brought to the area by French administration and the growing resentment of colonial rule contributed to the rapid rise in the power and influence of the brotherhoods. In recent decades, these orders have opposed tribalism and have been an indispensable element in the growth of nationalist sentiment. Since the Ahmadiyya Islamic movement has a large presence in West Africa, the African Muslim Congress met in Mauritania in 1976 to call upon African nations to regard Ahmadi Muslims as apostates, though with little success.

Sufi brotherhoods
In the 1980s, two brotherhoods (tariqa), the Qadiriyyah and the Tijaniyyah, accounted for nearly all the brotherhood membership in Mauritania. The Qadiriyyah and Tijaniyyah were essentially parallel "ways," differing primarily in their methods of reciting the litanies. Their Islamic doctrines and their religious obligations were basically similar. Two smaller brotherhoods also existed — the Shadhiliyyah, centered in Boumdeït in Tagant Region, and the Goudfiya, found in the regions of Tagant, Adrar, Hodh ech Chargui, and Hodh el Gharbi.

Indigenous traditions
As Islam spread westward and southward in Africa, various elements of indigenous religious systems became absorbed into and then altered strictly Islamic beliefs. For example, the Islamic tradition in Mauritania began to include a variety of spirits and supernatural beings, whilst recognizing Allah as the only God. Muslims in Mauritania believe in various lesser spirits apparently transformed from pre-Islamic faiths into Islamic spirits.

See also
 Islam by country
 Religion in Mauritania

References